Jonathan Peter "John" Hall (born ) is a retired rugby union player who played for Bath Rugby, Somerset, Barbarians, South & South Western Counties and . He was born in Bath.

He primarily played as a blind side flanker or number eight. His international debut was versus  in 1984. He did travel with the 1987 England World Cup team but did not play a match as he was injured in training and had to return to the UK. After starting his international career against Scotland, his final match was also against  in 1994, where Jon made a crucial tackle to deny Gary Armstrong a try, which ultimately won England the match. He ultimately gained 21 caps.

After retiring he was appointed director of rugby for the 1995-96 season and led them to league and cup double and led the club into the professional era but departed in following season. Subsequently, he became coach of the Garryowen club and took them to the All Ireland Final in 1999.

References

External links
 John Hall Captain of the London Pride Spinhalers
 Bath Rugby History
 Bath Rugby Hall of Fame
 Bath Rugby - Tales from the Legends
 ESPN Profile
 BBC - England Rugby Player competes in Race Across America
 Bath Chronicle 1986 John Player Cup Side - Where are they now?
 Rugby Union: Hall emerges from the dark
 Bath Rugby Heritage
 Sporting Heroes
 Rugby Network Interview

1962 births
Living people
Barbarian F.C. players
Bath Rugby players
Bath Rugby
England international rugby union players
English rugby union players
Rugby union players from Bath, Somerset
Rugby union flankers
Rugby union number eights